YFG may refer to:

 Yari Film Group
 Young Fine Gael
 Your Favorite Gene